Michel Vermote (born 31 March 1963) is a former Belgian racing cyclist. He rode in ten Grand Tours between 1987 and 1996.

Major results

1985
8th Circuit des Frontières
1986
2nd Overall Tour de Picardie
1st Stage 2a
4th Brussels–Ingooigem
8th Overall Tour de Luxembourg
1st Stage 3a
1987
1st Stage 2a Route du Sud
1st Stage 3b Tour de Luxembourg
2nd GP Stad Zottegem
6th Overall Tour of Britain
1st Points classification
1st Stage 5
1988
1st Stage 4 Route du Sud
2nd GP de Denain
8th Overall Circuit Cycliste Sarthe
1st Stage 3
8th Bordeaux–Paris
1989
8th Grand Prix de la Libération (TTT)
1990
2nd Overall Circuit Cycliste Sarthe
1st Stage 1
2nd Overall Étoile de Bessèges
2nd Brussels–Ingooigem
1991
1st  Overall Tour du Limousin
1st Stage 1
1st Stage 1 Paris–Bourges
3rd Binche–Tournai–Binche
1992
1st Omloop van de Westhoek
1st Stage 1 Tour du Poitou Charentes et de la Vienne
5th Grand Prix d'Ouverture La Marseillaise
1993
4th Circuit des Frontières
1994
3rd Zomergem–Adinkerke
1995
2nd Nokere Koerse
1997
1st  Overall Le Triptyque des Monts et Châteaux
1st Stages 1 & 3

References

External links

1963 births
Living people
Belgian male cyclists
Sportspeople from Tournai
Cyclists from Hainaut (province)